Niyazi Sel (12 March 1908 – 1 January 1990) was a Turkish footballer. He competed in the men's tournament at the 1936 Summer Olympics.

References

External links
 

1908 births
1990 deaths
Turkish footballers
Turkey international footballers
Olympic footballers of Turkey
Footballers at the 1936 Summer Olympics
Footballers from Istanbul
Association football midfielders
Fenerbahçe S.K. footballers